Hydnophora is a genus of large polyp stony corals in the family Merulinidae.

List of species 
According to World Register of Marine Species :

 Hydnophora bonsai Veron, 1990
 Hydnophora exesa (Pallas, 1766)
 Hydnophora grandis Gardiner, 1904
 Hydnophora microconos (Lamarck, 1816)
 Hydnophora pilosa Veron, 1985
 Hydnophora rigida (Dana, 1846)

References

Merulinidae
Scleractinia genera